Boualem Bouferma (born 29 September 1976 in Douéra, Algiers, Algeria) is an Algerian former professional footballer who played as a forward.

References

1976 births
Living people
Algerian footballers
Association football forwards
Footballers from Algiers
Algerian Ligue Professionnelle 1 players
Egyptian Premier League players
USM Blida players
CR Belouizdad players
Tersana SC players
CS Constantine players
RC Kouba players
Algerian expatriate footballers
Algerian expatriate sportspeople in Egypt
Expatriate footballers in Egypt
21st-century Algerian people